A cutaneous myxoma, or superficial angiomyxoma, consists of a multilobulated myxoid mass containing stellate or spindled fibroblasts with pools of mucin forming cleft-like spaces. There is often a proliferation of blood vessels and an inflammatory infiltrate. Staining is positive for vimentin, negative for cytokeratin and desmin, and variable for CD34, Factor VIIIa, SMA, MSA and S-100.

Clinically, it may present as solitary or multiple flesh-colored nodules on the face, trunk, or extremities. It may occur as part of the Carney complex, and is sometimes the first sign. Local recurrence is common.

See also
Myxoma
Skin lesion

References

Dermal and subcutaneous growths